The 2023 LA Galaxy season is the club's 28th season in Major League Soccer, the top-tier of the American soccer pyramid. LA Galaxy plays there home matches at Dignity Health Sports Park in the LA suburbs of Carson, California. The Galaxy will attempt to make the playoffs for the 2nd year in a row and to make and win the MLS Cup for the first time since 2014.

Squad information

Transfers

Transfers in

Transfers out

Draft picks 

Draft picks are not automatically signed to the team roster. Only those who are signed to a contract will be listed as transfers in.

Competitions

Preseason 
The preseason schedule was announced on December 15, 2022.

Major League Soccer

Standings

Overall

Western Conference

Regular season 
The full schedule was released on December 20, 2022.

All times in Pacific Time Zone.

Leagues Cup

West 3

U.S. Open Cup

Round of 32

References

External links 
 

LA Galaxy seasons
La Galaxy
La Galaxy
LA Galaxy